This is a list of famous people from Lakeland, Florida.

Entertainment

 Nat Adderley, jazz cornetist and composer
 Lindsey Alley, Mouseketeer and actress
 Bobby Braddock, record producer in Country Music Hall of Fame
 Howard J. Buss, composer
 Copeland, pop/alternative rock band
 Jonny Diaz, Christian musician
 Samantha Dorman, Playboy Playmate
 Rhea Durham, Victoria's Secret model
 Faith Evans, singer
 Stephen Baron Johnson, painter
 Frances Langford, singer, actress, and radio star (1930s and 1940s)
 Neva Jane Langley, Miss America 1953
 Mike Marshall, bluegrass musician and mandolinist
 Kara Monaco, Playboy Playmate
 Robert Phillips, guitarist
 Forrest Sawyer, NBC reporter and anchor
 SoulJa, rapper
 J. D. Sumner, singer-songwriter

Sports

 Chris Richard, NBA, Minnesota Timberwolves, Chicago Bulls
 Andy Bean, PGA Tour golfer
 Keon Broxton, Milwaukee Brewers Center Fielder
 Ahmad Black, NFL player, Tampa Bay Buccaneers
 Desmond Clark, NFL player, Chicago Bears
 Lance Davis, MLB player, Cincinnati Reds
 Matt Diaz, MLB player, Atlanta Braves
 Paul Edinger, NFL player, Minnesota Vikings and Chicago Bears
 Justin Forsett, running back, UC Berkeley
 Carson Fulmer, former Vanderbilt baseball player, drafted 8th overall by Chicago White Sox 
 Ronnie Ghent, football player
 Matt Grothe, quarterback, South Florida Bulls
 Nick Hamilton, pro wrestling referee
 Alice Haylett, AAGPBL All-Star pitcher
 Lee Janzen, PGA Tour golfer, U.S. Open winner
 Ray Lewis, NFL player, Baltimore Ravens, Super Bowl champion and MVP, 2-time NFL Defensive Player of the Year
 Rocco Mediate, PGA Tour golfer
 Freddie Mitchell, NFL player, Philadelphia Eagles and Kansas City Chiefs
 Joe Nemechek, NASCAR Sprint Cup driver
 Joe Niekro, MLB player
 Lance Niekro, MLB player, San Francisco Giants
 Steve Pearce, MLB player, Toronto Blue Jays
 Maurkice Pouncey, NFL player, Pittsburgh Steelers
 Mike Pouncey, NFL player, Miami Dolphins
 Boog Powell, MLB player, Baltimore Orioles
 Chris Rainey, NFL player, Pittsburgh Steelers
 Andrew Reynolds, professional skateboarder
 Chris Sale, MLB player, Boston Red Sox
 Brenda Sell, Taekwondo Grandmaster 
 Rod Smart, NFL & XFL player 
 Donnell Smith, NFL player, Green Bay Packers and New England Patriots
 Ron Smith, NFL player, Los Angeles Rams
 Bill Spivey, basketball player
 Jameson Taillon, MLB pitcher, Pittsburgh Pirates
 Justin Verlander, MLB pitcher, Houston Astros
 Keydrick Vincent, NFL player, Baltimore Ravens
 Chris Waters, MLB player, Milwaukee Brewers
 Lou Whitaker, MLB player, Detroit Tigers

Other
 Charles T. Canady, Chief Justice, Florida Supreme Court
 Lawton Chiles, Senator and Governor of Florida
 Carol Jenkins Barnett, philanthropist and businesswoman, the daughter of George W. Jenkins
 George W. Jenkins, founder of Publix Super Markets
 R. Albert Mohler Jr., president of Southern Baptist Theological Seminary
 Marvin Pipkin, scientist engineer that had many inventions and innovations for the light bulb.
 Gene Ready, Florida businessman and state legislator
 Charles Z. Smith, Associate Justice, Washington State Supreme Court
 Park Trammell, Mayor of Lakeland, Florida Attorney General, Governor of Florida and U.S. Senator

References

Lakeland
 
Lakeland